Uncreation is the debut album by the American heavy metal band Benedictum, released through Locomotive Records on March 14, 2006. The album was originally due to be released in late 2005, but was delayed to 2006 to allow for some creative tweaking.

Track listing 
"Uncreation" – 5:32
"Benedictum" – 3:46
"#4" – 3:55
"Misogyny" – 5:13
"Ashes to Ashes" – 3:50
"Wicca" – 4:05
"Heaven and Hell" – 7:47 (Black Sabbath cover)
"Them" – 4:02
"Two Steps to the Sun" – 3:22
"Valkyrie Rising" – 8:43
"The Mob Rules" – 3:14 (Black Sabbath cover)

Personnel
Veronica Freeman – vocals
Pete Wells – guitars
Jesse Wright – bass
Chris Morgan – keyboards
Blackie Sanchez – drums

Guest musicians
Craig Goldy - lead guitar on "Valkyrie Rising"
Jimmy Bain - bass on "The Mob Rules"
Jeff Pilson - additional bass

References

2006 debut albums
Benedictum albums
Locomotive Music albums